The 1995 Dinar earthquake occurred on 1 October in Dinar (District), Afyonkarahisar, Turkey. It had an  magnitude of 6.2 with an epicenter close to the Dinar-Çivril fault.

The earthquake occurred at a time of political instability in Turkey, with large strikes by public sector workers taking place just 11 days earlier. The disaster was preceded by a number of smaller earthquakes of up to 5.1 magnitude, the last of which had occurred on 26 September 1995. This resulted in a number of residents deciding to sleep outside their homes and possibly resulted in less deaths and injuries in the 1 October quake. When the quake occurred, 90 people were killed and more than 200 injured in the disaster.

In total, 2,473 homes suffered major damage, 1,218 moderate damage and 2,076 slight damage. The Turkish government responded by constructing 5,000 new homes for those affected by the disaster.

See also
 List of earthquakes in 1995
 List of earthquakes in Turkey

References

External links

Earthquakes in Turkey
1995 in Turkey
1995 earthquakes
October 1995 events in Turkey
1995 disasters in Turkey